Centerville, Illinois could refer to:

"Centerville, Illinois", the fictional setting of the 1983 science fiction spoof Strange Invaders
Centerville, Calhoun County, Illinois, an unincorporated community in Calhoun County
Centerville, Grundy County, Illinois, a former community in Grundy County
Centerville, Knox County, Illinois, an unincorporated community in Knox County
Centerville, Macoupin County, Illinois, an unincorporated community in Macoupin County
Centerville, Morgan County, Illinois, an unincorporated community in Morgan County
Centerville, Piatt County, Illinois, an unincorporated community in Piatt County
Centerville, White County, Illinois, an unincorporated community in White County
Cuba, Illinois, formerly known as Centerville
Woodstock, Illinois, formerly known as Centerville

See also
Centreville, Illinois, St. Clair County